Benjamin Pingo (3 February 1749 – 8 July 1794), was a Herald and son of Thomas Pingo the engraver.

Pingo was baptised on 8 July 1749 in the parish of St. Andrew, Holborn. He was the son of Thomas Pingo and his wife, Mary, daughter of Benjamin Goldwyre of Romsey, Hampshire.

In 1780 Pingo was appointed Rouge Dragon Pursuivant and served in that capacity until 1786. In 1786 he was appointed York Herald in which capacity he served until his death in 1794. Pingo died in a crush at the Haymarket Theatre on 3 February 1794. He left his manuscripts and works to the College of Heralds.

References

1749 births
1794 deaths
English genealogists
English officers of arms